Young Heretics were a musical duo based in Melbourne, Victoria, formed in 2009. The project comprises Kitty Hart and her half-brother, The Getaway Plan frontman Matthew Wright.

After their debut release EP The Dreamers was met with acclaim from the underground music scene worldwide, the siblings followed up with their debut album titled We Are The Lost Loves seven months later. The months in-between were spent touring the country alongside Australian bands Kid Sam, Parades, Jonathan Boulet, Gin Wigmore, Bertie Blackman and Philadelphia Grand Jury.

The self-produced album was recorded with the help of Tom Larkin (of Shihad fame) at three different Melbourne studios.

More than 60 musicians and audio effects by movie maker Peter Jackson were used to create the album. The band caused a stir within the media when they decided to leak the full album for free a month before its official release.

The duo commenced their first full band tour around Australia in July 2010 in support of the album, with  Comic Sans, Siren Lines and Guineafowl supporting.

In July 2010 Young Heretics signed to Japanese indie label Cocoheart Records; their album was released into stores in Japan on 22 September 2010.

Kitty Hart is a passionate animal rights activist and member of Animals Australia. Young Heretics headlined World Vegan Day 2010.

In 2011 the band went on hiatus while Matthew records the second album with Rock band The Getaway Plan and Kitty is writing for indie folk project Magic Spells.

Personnel
 Kitty Hart
 Matthew Wright

Discography

Studio albums
2010: We Are The Lost Loves

Extended plays
2009: The Dreamers EP

References

External links
Young Heretics Official Blog

Victoria (Australia) musical groups
Musical groups established in 2009